The 1916 United States Senate election in Massachusetts was held on November 7, 1916. Republican incumbent Henry Cabot Lodge defeated Democratic Mayor of Boston John F. Fitzgerald to win election to a fifth term.

This was the first United States Senate election in Massachusetts decided by popular vote, as required by the Seventeenth Amendment to the United States Constitution.

Republican primary

Candidates
 Henry Cabot Lodge, incumbent Senator since 1893

Results

Democratic primary

Candidates
 John F. Fitzgerald, former Mayor of Boston and U.S. Representative (grandfather of future President John F. Kennedy)

Campaign
The Democratic state convention was held in Springfield on October 7. Fitzgerald addressed the convention, praising President Wilson and criticizing Lodge, his Senate colleague John W. Weeks, and former President Theodore Roosevelt for opposing the President's re-election during war-time.

Results

General election

Candidates
John F. Fitzgerald, former Mayor of Boston and U.S. Representative (Democratic)
Henry Cabot Lodge, incumbent U.S. Senator since 1893 (Republican)
 William N. McDonald (Socialist)

Campaign
The first shot of the general election came in September, before the primary elections. At a Lodge campaign rally in Beverly, the Senator made no mention of Fitzgerald, but campaign backer Arthur Black criticized the former mayor's candidacy as a vanity run. Lodge focused his campaign on criticism of President Wilson and support for Republican nominee Charles Evans Hughes.

Fitzgerald attacked Lodge for his opposition to the direct election of Senators and the Federal Employees' Compensation Act. He declared that "[Lodge's] career shows a singular lack of touch with the people... it is for private interests that he has stood during his career."

Lodge also faced criticism over his charge of weakness against President Wilson's response to the sinking of the RMS Lusitania. Lodge was forced to withdraw his charge.

Results

Aftermath
In 1952, Fitzgerald's grandson John F. Kennedy defeated Lodge's grandson Henry Cabot Lodge Jr. to win election to this same Senate seat. Fitzgerald's daughter Rose Fitzgerald Kennedy would say that her son John had "evened the score" with the Lodges and avenged her father's defeat. A final contest between the two families came in 1962, when Ted Kennedy defeated George C. Lodge for the same seat.

References

Bibliography

1916
Massachusetts
1916 Massachusetts elections